London Business School (LBS) is a business school and a constituent college of the federal University of London. LBS was founded in 1964 and awards post-graduate degrees (Master's degrees in management and finance, MBA and PhD). Its motto is "To have a profound impact on the way the world does business". LBS is consistently ranked amongst the world's best business schools.

The main campus is located at Sussex Place in London, adjacent to Regent's Park. In 2012, the school acquired the Marylebone Town Hall and spent £60 million to refurbish it with the objective of expanding its teaching facilities by 70% - the new building is called The Sammy Ofer Centre. In 2017, it was announced that LBS had also acquired the site of the Royal College of Obstetricians and Gynaecologists, who vacated the building in November 2019.
LBS has a secondary campus in Dubai that is dedicated to Executive Education and the Dubai EMBA.

History

Foundation 

London Business School was founded in 1964 under the name of the London Graduate School of Business Studies', with Dr. Arthur Earle as Dean. In 1965, the school was registered as a company and was designated by the University of London as an institution having recognised teachers. In 1966, the first Executive Development Programme was launched, followed by the Senior Executive Programme. The same year, a full-time MSc degree was also launched, with Sheila Cross enrolling as the School's first female student. In 1968, the School inaugurated the Sloan Fellowship MSc programme, which was the first one outside of the US. 17 students were enrolled and the programme was funded by the Alfred P. Sloan foundation. The first doctoral programme was established in 1969 and in 1970 Her Majesty Queen Elizabeth II opened the School's Regent's Park campus. The first PhD was awarded in 1974, and that year women made up over 15% of the student body for the first time. In 1983, the first part-time MBA programme was held under the direction of Sir Andrew Likierman, a former Dean of the School. In 1986, the school officially became the London Business School and was incorporated by Royal Charter, which gave LBS the right to confer and grant degrees. In 1992, the School was given the Queen's Award for Export in recognition of providing educational services to managers and companies worldwide. The following year, the school started its first Masters in Finance programme and in 2001, the EMBA-Global degree programme in partnership with the Columbia Business School.

In 2007 a new campus was opened in Dubai to offer both Executive MBA and Executive Education Programmes. In 2009, the school started two new programmes: The EMBA-Global Asia, in partnership with the University of Hong Kong and Columbia Business School, and the Masters in Management (MiM). In 2012, the school acquired Marylebone Town Hall and restored it with the objective of expanding its teaching facilities by 70 per cent. The building was renamed "The Sammy Ofer Centre" in honour of a generous donor, the Ofer Family, who made a gift for the development of the building, which was opened in 2017. In 2016, LBS launched a new programme, the Masters in Financial Analysis, aimed at recent graduates who wish to pursue a career in finance, and acquired the lease of the neighbouring building of the Royal College of Obstetricians and Gynaenocologists, which it will occupy in 2020.

With the objective of increasing its size, the school organised a £100 million funding campaign. By the beginning of 2016, it had raised £98 million, £40 million of which will be used to renovate the Marylebone Town Hall, with £28 million for research, £18 million in scholarships for students, £10 million to increase the school's endowment, and £4 million to improve technology across the school. By June 2016, the school had raised £125 million, including two £25 million gifts from alumni Jim Ratcliffe and Idan Ofer.

François Ortalo-Magné, the French-born former Dean of the Wisconsin School of Business, succeeded Sir Andrew Likierman as Dean in August 2017.

Campus

The campus is located at Sussex Place in Marylebone, on the perimeter of Regent's Park.

LBS maintains a number of facilities, including a sports centre, restaurant, three cafes and a library, all dedicated for the exclusive use of its community. There is also a privately run pub, 'The Windsor Castle' attached to the campus. Most classrooms for the MBA are located in the Sainsbury Wing, the centre of the terrace, most of which are 100-student amphitheatre rooms.

There is no accommodation on campus for students in full-time programmes, although there are rooms on-campus for visiting faculty and executive education participants. Most students choose to live in nearby private residential buildings or in students halls of residence such as the International Students House, London.

LBS is expanding its campus in central London. The business school has redeveloped the Marylebone Town Hall into classrooms and offices at the Sammy Ofer Centre.  It will further expand it in 2020 (see above).

 Organisation and administration 

 List of the London Business School Deans 
List of the Deans from 1965 to today:

 Academics 
 Admission 
All candidates must take international exams related to their English abilities (TOEFL) or IELTS and mathematic/logical reasoning skills (GMAT or GRE). Candidates are also asked to write several essays (topics are related to the envisaged programmes). The recruitment process has two steps. The first one consists of sending an application with the following information:
 An application form (administrative and academic information on the candidate, but also his/her career plan and personal ambitions)
 Several essays
 The GMAT or GRE scores. The average GMAT score is usually around 700 (90th percentile)
 The TOEFL scores (English test)
 A one-page résumé (CV)
 Two reference letters (one academic and one professional)
 The candidate's academic transcript
Once the application has been accepted, an examination is made by the selection committee. Candidates meeting the criteria of the school will be invited for an interview on campus in London. If this latter step is a success, the candidate receives an offer from LBS.

 Master in Business Administration (MBA) 
The school's flagship programme is its full-time 15–21-month Master of Business Administration degree. MBA students take a prescribed set of core courses then choose from roughly 70 different electives. Class size has been around 400 students in every annual cohort. These are broken into 5 streams of approximately 80 students who take all core courses together. The admission process is highly competitive and selective.

Beyond academics, the school puts an emphasis on personal and professional development including leadership, global awareness, and business skill building. These developments are facilitated via specialized workshops led by external consultants, students, and faculty. In addition to a range of elective courses at the London Business School, the school has partnerships with around 32 exchange schools around the world.  Each academic year around 100 students spend a term at another leading business school.

The MBA program at LBS is widely considered to be one of the top 10 in the world. In the Financial Times' 2015 Global MBA Rankings, LBS ranked 2nd in the world just behind Harvard Business School. In CNN Expansion's 2014 Global MBA Rankings, LBS ranked 5th in the world. In Business Insider's 2014 Global MBA Rankings, LBS ranked 9th in the world. In 2016, the school's MBA program was ranked No. 21 worldwide for social and environmental impact by Corporate Knights magazine. Within Europe, LBS consistently ranks as one of the top 2 programmes. In the 2014/2015 QS Global 200 Business Schools Report, the London Business School MBA Program ranked 1st among all one-year and two-year European MBA programs. Among non-U.S. two-year MBA programmes, LBS was ranked 1st by Bloomberg BusinessWeek in 2012, 3rd by The Economist in 2012, 1st by Financial Times in 2014 and 2012, and 1st by Forbes'' in 2011, 2012, and 2013.

The MBA Programme has one of the world's largest international exchange programmes. Each year approximately 35 percent of second-year MBAs spend a term abroad at one of over 30 partner schools, including NYU Stern School of Business, IESE Business School, Booth School of Business of The University of Chicago, The Wharton School of the University of Pennsylvania, UCLA Anderson School of Management, the MIT Sloan School of Management, Tuck School of Business at Dartmouth College, Columbia Business School, Kellogg School of Management at Northwestern University, Haas School of Business at UC Berkeley, McDonough School of Business at Georgetown University, Indian School of Business among others.

 Executive MBA 
The school offers four Executive (part-time) MBA degrees, which are completed in 16–20 months. At an academic level, the school offers the same degree to both Executive (part-time) and full-time MBA students. The programmes involve very similar core courses to the full-time MBA, international field work and a wide range of elective courses. The course ends with a capstone together with company project or management report.
 Executive MBA (London).
 Executive MBA (Dubai). The programme begins with an orientation week in London. Following this, students take 10 core modules, which are taught in a four- or five-day block each month in Dubai. Students then undertake electives, which are primarily offered in London, and an international assignment. Two additional core modules take place in London. 
 EMBA-Global Americas and Europe. A further 140 executives are enrolled in the dual-degree EMBA-Global Programme. It is taught in partnership with Columbia Business School. Graduates are awarded degrees from both universities. The first year involves week-long modules each month alternating between London and New York. In the second year, students select from the full range of electives available at the participating schools.
 EMBA-Global Asia'''. launched in 2008 jointly with Hong Kong University and Columbia. Teaching takes place at all three business schools. While the first year is modelled on the transatlantic EMBA-Global, the school states that because "EMBA-Global Asia is designed for people who have or will have significant trans-national responsibilities, all courses reflect a greater proportion of global material".

Sloan Masters in Leadership and Strategy 
The Sloan Fellowship was established in 1968 and is a master's degree programme designed for senior executives, accomplished professionals and entrepreneurs with significant experience of decision-making at strategic levels. The admission process is highly competitive and selective. On average, Sloan Fellows already have 15 years of management experience when being admitted to the programme. A typical class is highly diverse and includes attendees from 13 to 23 countries.

This 12-month, full-time master's degree programme focuses on strategy, leadership and change, and globalisation. The Sloan programme is also offered at Stanford Graduate School of Business and the MIT Sloan School of Management.

Masters in Finance 
The school offers a Master's in Finance ("MiF") programme on both a part- and full-time basis. Around 120 students attend the full-time programme, while 60 attend the part-time degree. In 2011, 2012, 2013, 2014, 2015, 2017, and 2020 it was ranked in 1st place amongst Masters in Finance (post-experience) programmes in the world by the Financial Times.

Masters in Financial Analysis (MFA) 
The Masters in Financial Analysis is the most recent programme offered by the London Business School, starting in September 2016 and consists of 12 months of courses. The programme targets recent graduates with less than a year of work experience who plan to start a career in finance, typically as an analyst in an investment bank or in consulting. The curriculum consists of 12 core courses based on 5 pillars (Accounting, Corporate Finance, Asset Management, Financial Markets, and Financial Econometrics). The 12 courses are:
 Corporate Finance
 Capital Structure
 Mergers & Acquisitions
 Investment Fundamentals
 Asset Management
 Analysis of Financial Statements
 Securities Valuation and Financial Modelling
 World Economy
 Financial Institutions
 Personal Finance
 Private Equity
 Data and Time Series Analytics
Students must also complete three electives of which a minimum of two must be related to finance. The programme includes a business immersion week within a company (Google, Deloitte, CNN, Accenture, Blackrock etc.) to work on case studies. Finally, students participate in a Field Trip (study trip) that lasts a week. This travel experience consists of many networking dinners, company visits, and company presentations. The following destinations are available: Silicon Valley, Paris, Milan and Munich, Mumbai and Bangalore, or Shanghai.

Masters in Management (MiM) 
The Masters in Management (MiM) is a one-year master's degree in management aimed at recent graduates who have less than one year of full-time postgraduate corporate work experience or less than two years of experience in a non-traditional business role.

The programme is structured in 3 terms, composed of the following core courses:

First term:
 Financial Accounting
 Data Analytics for Management
 Finance
 Performance in Organisations
Second term:
 The Global Macroeconomy
 Marketing
 Strategic Analysis
 Decision and Risk Analysis
Third term:
 Applied Microeconomics
 Introduction to Management Accounting
Students must also follow 2 electives and can choose among 30 different courses. The programme includes a business immersion week within a company (Google, Deloitte, CNN, Accenture, Blackrock etc.) to work on case studies. Finally, students have to participate in a Field Trip (study trip) that lasts a week. This travel experience consists of many networking dinners, company visits, and company presentations. The following destinations are available: Silicon Valley, Paris, Milan and Munich, Mumbai and Bangalore, or Shanghai.

In 2018 & 2019 the programme was ranked 3rd in the world by the Financial Times, having been in the global top 10 since it became eligible for the ranking. The programme has a very good market placement. 96% of the 2015 graduates accepted an offer within three months of graduation. 40% work in consulting, 35% in finance and the rest in different industries. The most prestigious companies recruit on campus. The top 3 recruiters are the Boston Consulting Group (11 students hired in 2015), Goldman Sachs (8 students hired in 2015), and McKinsey & Company (7 students hired in 2015). Among the other companies that recruited 2 MiM students or more in 2015 are, for example, Oliver Wyman, Arthur D. Little, Deloitte, A.T. Kearney, and Bain & Company.

Global Masters in Management 
The Global Masters in Management (Global MiM) is a two-year, full-time course starting in September 2015, where students attain two internationally recognized degrees: a Masters in Management (MiM) and a Masters in Science (MSc) in International Business. Year one takes place in London. Year two takes place in Shanghai.

Delivered jointly by London Business School and the renowned Fudan School of Management in Shanghai, the Global MiM gives an unparalleled grounding in international business challenges preparing for the opportunities of tomorrow.

Executive education
About 10,000 executives attend the school's non-degree programmes each year. The school offers a portfolio of 31 Executive Education programmes in general management, strategy, leadership, marketing, human resources and finance. These programmes are split into two main areas, open and custom. About 45 companies per year commission London Business School to design and deliver customised corporate programmes for them, 60% of which are delivered outside the UK.

International university rankings 
2022 Financial Times 

MBA - 8th in world, 2nd in Europe

Executive Education - 5th in the world

Research
The school's 150 faculty work through 16 research centres or institutes. According to the 2014 Research Excellence Framework, the school had the joint highest percentage of world-leading research of any British higher education institution (along with the Courtauld Institute of Art) with 56% of research rated in the 4* category.

PhD programme
The school offers a 5-year full-time PhD programme. It supports 60 fully funded PhD candidates in seven doctoral programmes: Accounting, Economics, Finance, Management Science & Operations, Marketing, Organisational Behaviour, and Strategic & International Management.

Student life

Clubs
There are over 70 student clubs at the school. These range from professional clubs such as consulting, entrepreneurship and energy clubs, to regional clubs including the Latin American and China club. There are also general interest and sporting clubs such as football, wine and cheese and the salsa club.

Notable people

Alumni
Kaveh Alamouti, MBA & PhD – CEO of Citadel LLC Asset Management Europe
Simon Borrows – CEO of 3i
Ashley Almanza – CEO of G4S
Prince Chad Al-Sherif Pasha of the Hijaz and Turkey
Nigel Andrews, MSc, 1978 – former chairman of Old Mutual Asset Management
Sir David Arculus – chairman, O2
Nicholas Ashley-Cooper, 12th Earl of Shaftesbury, MBA
Sükhbaataryn Batbold, "a degree", 1991 – former Prime Minister of Mongolia
Pablo Zalba Bidegain, Executive MBA – Member of European Parliament (Spain)
Kumar Birla, MBA, 1992 – Chairman, Aditya Birla Group
Ronald Boire – Former President and CEO of Brookstone
Vice Admiral Paul Boissier, MSc – Former CB Deputy Commander-in-Chief, British Navy Maritime Forces; CEO of Royal National Lifeboat Institution (RNLI)
Jonathan Coleman – Member of Parliament (New Zealand)
Don Cowan – Former CEO and President of ABN AMRO Bank Canada
Stephen Crabb – member of the British House of Commons and former Secretary of State for Wales and for the Department of Work and Pensions
David Davis – UK Cabinet Member responsible for Brexit negotiations 
Sir John Egan – Former CEO of Jaguar Cars, Former CEO of BAA, Chairman of Severn Trent plc
Philip Nevill Green – Chairman of Carillion
Justine Greening – Secretary of State for Education and member of the British House of Commons
Gillian Keegan – British Conservative Party politician and Member of Parliament for Chichester
Sir Richard Greenbury – former Chairman and CEO, Marks & Spencer
Illugi Gunnarsson – Minister of Education, Science, and Culture, Iceland
Prince Faisal bin Al Hussein – Special Assistant to Chairman & Joint Chiefs of Staff, Jordanian Armed Forces
Hassan Jameel, Saudi businessman
Sir John Jennings (businessman) – former CEO, Shell 
Moez Kassam – Founder of Anson Group
Maria Kiwanuka – Minister of Finance in Cabinet of Uganda
Timothy Kopra – NASA Astronaut
Thomas Kwok – Vice Chairman and Managing Director, Sun Hung Kai Properties
Alex Loudon – former professional cricketer
Dame Mary Marsh – former CEO of NSPCC
Stephen Martin (MBA 2003) – former CEO of Clugston Group, director general of the Institute of Directors
Cyrus Pallonji Mistry, former Chairman and CEO of the Tata Group
Nigel Morris – co-founder, Capital One Financial Services
David Muir – Director of Political Strategy, to then British Prime Minister Gordon Brown MP
Ray O'Rourke – CEO of Laing O'Rourke
Idan Ofer – Chairman of Israel Corporation / Principal of Quantum Pacific International Limited
Paul Onwuanibe – CEO of Landmark Group
Kenneth Ouriel – vascular surgeon and medical researcher
Mike Parsons – CEO of Barchester Healthcare
Ted Pietka – Supervisory Board Member of Boryszew
Roys Poyiadjis – entrepreneur and financier
David E.I. Pyott – former Chairman, President, and CEO of Allergan
Ramji Raghavan – founder and Chairman of Agastya International Foundation
Jim Ratcliffe – Chairman and CEO of Ineos Chemicals Group
Omar Samra – first Egyptian and youngest Arab to climb Mount Everest
Sir John Sunderland – former Chairman, Cadbury Schweppes plc
Amina Taher – VP, Etihad Aviation
Stewart Wallis – Executive Director of New Economics Foundation
Tony Wheeler – founder, Lonely Planet
Wong Kan Seng – former Deputy Prime Minister, Singapore
Roberto Vedovotto, CEO of Kering Eyewear since 2014
Babajide Sanwo-Olu - incumbent Governor of Lagos State, Nigeria

Alumni association 
The London Business School has 39,000 alumni in more than 150 countries. Many local clubs (Paris, New-York, Zurich etc.) organise recurrent events in their city.

Faculty and staff 
Sir James Ball, economist
Süleyman Başak – financial economist 
Sir Alan Budd – professor of economics, director of the Centre for Economic Forecasting, economic advisor for Barclays Bank, and member of the Advisory Board for Research Councils
Terence Burns, Baron Burns – Chairman of Abbey National plc, Non-Executive Chairman of Glas Cymru, and a Non-Executive Director of Pearson Group plc.
Rajesh Chandy – Professor of Entrepreneurship and Marketing.
Gary Hamel – originator (with C.K. Prahalad) of the concept of core competencies of an organization, and contributed to the theoretical development and evolution of the resource-based view
Charles Handy – former professor – London Business School, rated among Thinkers 50 – a list of the most influential living management thinkers
Jack Mahoney – Dixons Professor of Business Ethics and Social Responsibility
Constantinos C. Markides – Robert P. Bauman Professor of Strategic Leadership
Kamalini Ramdas – Professor of Management Science and Operations and Deloitte Chair in Innovation & Entrepreneurship
Hélène Rey – Professor of Economics
Richard Portes – economist
Herminia Ibarra – Charles Handy Professor of Organizational Behavior
Julian Birkinshaw - Professor of Strategy and Entrepreneurship

See also
List of business schools in Europe

References

External links
London Business School

 
University of London
Educational institutions established in 1964
1964 establishments in England
Business schools in England
Grade I listed buildings in the City of Westminster
Business schools in the United Arab Emirates
Universities UK